Max Mirnyi and Philipp Oswald were the defending champions, but Mirnyi retired from professional tennis at the end of 2018 and Oswald chose not to participate this year.

Kevin Krawietz and Andreas Mies won their first ATP Tour title, defeating Santiago González and Aisam-ul-Haq Qureshi in the final, 6–4, 7–5.

Seeds

Draw

Draw

References

 Main Draw

New York Open
New York Open (tennis)